Ihor Nekhayev (born 20 December 1999) is a professional Ukrainian football striker who plays for Stal Kamianske.

Career
Born in Donetsk, Nekhayev is a product of the different cities sportive schools.

In summer 2016 Nekhayev signed contract with FC Stal Kamianske and played in the Ukrainian Premier League Reserves. He made his debut in the Ukrainian Premier League for Stal Kamianske on 12 August 2017, playing in a match against FC Vorskla Poltava.

References

External links 

1999 births
Living people
Footballers from Donetsk
Ukrainian footballers
FC Stal Kamianske players
Ukrainian Premier League players
Association football forwards